Get 100 is a British television children's quiz programme that was broadcast by CBBC between 16 April 2007 and 26 February 2009. It was originally hosted by Reggie Yates for the first series, then Hardeep Singh Kohli for the second series.

Format

Series 1
The aim of the game is to get exactly, or as close to, 100 points by the end of 12 questions.  The answer to each question is a number, which is the number of points you have "to play with". With the points you can keep them, give them to someone or, if possible, take them away from someone else. If you have 100 at the end of the game you get the ultimate "prize pod". This is a whole room full of games, computers, televisions, and similar prizes but if no-one gets 100, then the closest to 100, at the end of the game, gets to pick one of the prizes in the prize pod.

Series 2
The show was changed considerably. It had new graphics, no voiceover, a new presenter and a new logo. The most noticeable change was that the original "preliminary" rounds and the Friday final were changed. In this series, they played as normal but did not have a final and instead, the winner of each show won a prize from the prize pod.

Participation
The game had 4 contestants and an audience of roughly 130. Each contestant has a section supporting them. The answer to any question is a number between 1-99 and contestants get 10 seconds' thinking time. If a contestant gets a question wrong, then it moves on to the next person and if they don't get it right then it will move on again and so on until it comes to the last person.

Facilities
It is run by BBC Scotland in Glasgow and filmed in their studio. The studio has four big screens, surrounding the players.

Transmissions

External links

2007 British television series debuts
2009 British television series endings
2000s British children's television series
BBC children's television shows
BBC television game shows
2000s British game shows